Wie die Wilden ("Like the Savages") is an East German television film. It was released in 1959.

External links
 

1959 films
East German films
1950s German-language films
German-language television shows
German television films
Television in East Germany